Kalvis Kalniņš (born 16 February 1991) is a Latvian karateka. He is a five-time medalist at the European Karate Championships: in total, he won one gold medal, two silver medals and two bronze medals. He also won one of the bronze medals in the men's kumite 60 kg event at the 2010 World Karate Championships held in Belgrade, Serbia.

He represented Latvia at the 2020 Summer Olympics in Tokyo, Japan. He competed in the men's 67 kg event where he did not advance to compete in the semifinals.

Career 

He won one of the bronze medals in the men's kumite 60 kg event at the 2010 World Karate Championships held in Belgrade, Serbia.

In 2019, he won the gold medal in the men's kumite 60 kg event at the European Games held in Minsk, Belarus.

In May 2021, he won the silver medal in his event at the European Karate Championships held in Poreč, Croatia. In June 2021, he competed at the World Olympic Qualification Tournament held in Paris, France hoping to qualify for the 2020 Summer Olympics in Tokyo, Japan. He did not qualify at this tournament, as he was eliminated in his first match, but he was able to qualify via continental representation soon after.

He competed in the men's kumite 60 kg event at the 2022 World Games held in Birmingham, United States.

Achievements

References

External links 
 

Living people
1991 births
Place of birth missing (living people)
Latvian male karateka
European Games gold medalists for Latvia
Karateka at the 2019 European Games
European Games medalists in karate
Karateka at the 2020 Summer Olympics
Competitors at the 2022 World Games
21st-century Latvian people